Estoloides costaricensis is a species of beetle in the family Cerambycidae. It was described by Stephan von Breuning in 1940. It is known from Costa Rica, Honduras, and Nicaragua.

References

Estoloides
Beetles described in 1940